The general communication channel (GCC) was defined by G.709 is an in-band side channel used to carry transmission management and signaling information within optical transport network elements.

Two types of GCC are available:

 GCC0 – two bytes within OTUk overhead. GCC0 is terminated at every 3R (re-shaping, re-timing, re-amplification) point and used to carry GMPLS signaling protocol and/or management information.
 GCC1/2 – four bytes (each of two bytes) within ODUk overhead. These bytes are used for client end-to-end information and shouldn't be touched by the OTN equipment.

In contrast to SONET/SDH where the data communication channel (DCC) has a constant data rate, GCC data rate depends on the OTN line rate. For example, GCC0 data rate in the case of OTU1 is ~333kbit/s, and for OTU2 its data rate is ~1.3 Mbit/s.

Computer networking
Optical Transport Network